Events in the year 2018 in Egypt.

Incumbents
President: Abdel Fattah el-Sisi
Prime Minister: Sherif Ismail

Events

6 February onwards – the 2018 Cyprus gas dispute, involving Turkish rejection of a 2013 Cypriot-Egyptian maritime border demarcation deal
9 February – initiation of Comprehensive Operation – Sinai 2018
26 to 28 March – In the Egyptian presidential election, 2018, incumbent president Abdel Fattah el-Sisi was reelected with a majority of the votes.

Deaths

1 January – Ebrahim Nafae, journalist (b. 1934).
29 March – Mohamed Shaker, diplomat and political scientist (b. 1933)
2 April – Ahmed Khaled Tawfik, novelist (b. 1962).
10 April – Samir Gharbo, water polo player (b. 1925).
6 May – Khaled Mohieddin, politician and military officer (b. 1922)
29 July – Anba Epiphanius, Coptic prelate, Abbot of Monastery of Saint Macarius the Great (b. 1954).
6 August – Sanaa Mazhar, actress (b. 1932).

References

 
2010s in Egypt
Years of the 21st century in Egypt
Egypt
Egypt
Egypt